Falsimohnia fulvicans is a species of sea snail, a marine gastropod mollusk in the family Buccinidae.

Description
The length of the shell attains 8.2 mm, its diameter 4.6 mm.

Distribution
This marine species occurs off Southern Argentina and South Georgia

References

 Strebel, H. 1908. Die Gastropoden (mit Ausnahme de nackten Opisthobranchier). Wissenschaftliche Ergebnisse der Schwedischen Südpolar-Expedition 1901-1903 6(1): 111 pp., 6 pls 
 Kantor Yu.I. & Harasewych M.G. (2013) Antarctica, where turrids and whelks converge: A revision of Falsimohnia Powell, 1951 (Neogastropoda: Buccinoidea) and a description of a new genus. The Nautilus 127(2): 43-56
  Tucker, J.K. 2004 Catalog of recent and fossil turrids (Mollusca: Gastropoda). Zootaxa 682:1-1295.

Falsimohnia